Lomaspilis opis is a moth belonging to the family Geometridae. The species was first described by Arthur Gardiner Butler in 1878.

It is native to Eurasia.

References

Abraxini
Moths described in 1878
Moths of Asia
Moths of Europe
Taxa named by Arthur Gardiner Butler